Ballyhide is a rural townland and village in the extreme south eastern corner of County Laois, Ireland at the border with County Carlow. The nearest urban centre is Carlow town which is 3 kilometres to the north east. It is located in the Luggacurren Local Electoral District.

Demographics 
As of the 2011 census, the townland of Ballyhide had a population of 163 people. The most densely populated area of Ballyhide is a small village situated beside the River Barrow at the border with Crossneen, another local townland. Some of the population are employed in Carlow town, while others work in the Clogrennane Lime plant which is situated 2.5 kilometres to the south west. The area is agricultural, and dairying is the main farming enterprise.

Geography 
Ballyhide townland is in the historic barony of Slievemargy. It is bordered to the south by the River Barrow and the county boundary between County Laois and County Carlow, to the east by Crossneen and to the north by Springhill which are other townlands within the same parish. The River Fuishoge also runs through the area and is a tributary of the Barrow. The area lies at the foot of a 336m high hill referred to as Rossmore, Killeshin hill and often on maps as Slieve Margy.

Landmarks 
The ruin of a mansion, often referred to locally as Rochfort's Castle or the Black Castle, sits at the foot of the hill overlooking Ballyhide. It was once owned by the Rochfort family, an Anglo-Irish landlord family, who were landlords for much of the area prior to the Irish War of Independence. The Primary Valuation of Ireland, or 'Griffiths Valuation', carried out in Laois in 1851/52 refers to the local landlord as Horace Rochfort Esq. The mansion was burned down, leaving it in its current ruined state. Although there is some dispute and little evidence relating to who burned it down, one local story is that the local Irish Republican Army flying column burned the Rochforts out in revenge for the eviction of a woman who couldn't pay the rent when her husband died. Another story is that her sons burned the house and kidnapped the Rochforts' two sons. Although no evidence is available to verify either story a column was known to have been active in the area and the house certainly did not survive the war.

Ballyhide's location on the banks of the Barrow makes it a common fishing spot. In particular, the stretch of river where the small canal rejoins the Barrow, locally as Lanigans Lock, is known for trout fishing and was a swimming spot although Laois County Council have posted signs warning of the dangers of swimming in the water here. A walkway known as the Barrow track runs from Milford, downriver of Ballyhide through this area and into Carlow town.

Sport 
There are two Gaelic football clubs in the area, Graiguecullen GAA and Killeshin GAA. Some Ballyhide people also use the sports facilities in or around Carlow town such as the Carlow Lawn Tennis Club or Carlow Golf Club or play soccer with Killeshin or with Graiguecullen based clubs St Patricks Boys FC or St Fiaccs FC.

Education 
The local primary schools include Scoil Chomhgáin Naofa, Killeshin and St Fiaccs National School, Graiguecullen. Children may go on to study at second level in any of Carlows second level schools such as St Leo's College, Carlow for girls, the Christian Brothers Academy for boys or mixed schools such as Carlow Vocational School, Gaelcholáiste Ceatharlach or Presentation College. Boys may also choose to attend St. Mary's Knockbeg College.

See also
 List of towns and villages in Ireland

References

Towns and villages in County Laois
Townlands of County Laois